Örup Castle is a castle in Tomelilla Municipality, Scania, in southern Sweden. Located a few kilometers south of Tomelilla, together with Glimmingehus, Bollerup Castle and Tosterup Österlen, the castles were built during the late Middle Ages. They were built as mighty defenses in an uncertain and dangerous time, when the Swedes and Danes fought over power and lords believed they must protect their own soil against both external enemies.

See also
List of castles in Sweden

Castles in Skåne County